Serbonian Bog was an area of wetland in a lagoon lying between the eastern Nile Delta, the Isthmus of Suez, Mount Casius, and the Mediterranean Sea  in Egypt, with Lake Sirbonis at its center. The lagoon still exists, and is the second-largest in Egypt.
The bog is used as a metaphor in English for an inextricable situation.

Sirbonis in classical sources 
As described by Herodotus, Strabo and other ancient geographers and historians, the Serbonian Bog was a mix of genuine sand bars, quicksand, asphalt (according to Strabo) and pits covered with shingle, with a channel running through it to the lake. This gave the wetlands the deceptive appearance of being a lake surrounded by mostly solid land. The term in its name can mean "lake", but more usually means a "marshy lake" or mere.

The Serbonian Lake is identified as  Lake Bardawil (Sabkhat al Bardawil), on the Sinai Peninsula's north coast. According to Diodorus Siculus, most of the army of the King of Persia was lost there after his successful taking of Sidon in his attempt to restore Egypt to Persian rule.

Uses
Beginning with Milton, who used it in his description of Hell, the term Serbonian Bog is applied metaphorically in English to any situation in which one is entangled from which extrication is difficult.

{{Blockquote
|text=A Gulf profound as that Serbonian bog
Betwixt Damiata and Mount Casius old
Where Armies whole have sunk: the parching Air.
|author=John Milton
|title="Paradise Lost"
|source=Book II:292-94 (1674)
}}

Philosophy & Political Science
Edmund Burke used it in his Reflections on the Revolution in France (1790):

"The whole of the power obtained by this revolution will settle in the towns among the burghers and the monied directors who lead them. ... Here end all the deceitful dreams and visions of the equality and rights of men. In 'the Serbonian bog' of this base oligarchy they are all absorbed, sunk, and lost for ever."
Economics
Milton's description was quoted as the epigraph to the chapter "Markets with non-convex preferences and production" presenting "Quasi-equilibria in markets with non-convex preferences" by Ross Starr in the textbook General Competitive Analysis by Kenneth J. Arrow and Frank H. Hahn.

Law
In his published opinion in In re Dow, 213 F. 355 (E.D.S.C. 1914), Judge Smith wrote regarding judicial interpretations of the racial prerequisite in the early U.S. naturalization statute: "All of which foregoing discussion may seem wholly out of place in a reasoned legal opinion as to the construction of a statute, except as illustrating the Serbonian bog into which a court or judge will plunge that attempts to make the words 'white persons' conform to any racial classification."

United States Supreme Court Justice Benjamin N. Cardozo used it in a dissenting opinion, stating:"The attempted distinction between accidental results and accidental means will plunge this branch of the law into a Serbonian Bog."

Justice Dimmick used it in his dissenting opinion in State v. Cameron, 674 P.2d 650 (Wash. 1983).
"In Crenshaw we began the odyssey. Today's majority opinion now leads us further into the Serbonian bog.

The Cardozo statement was echoed by another Supreme Court Justice, Sandra Day O'Connor:"We recognise that any standard requiring Courts to distinguish causes that are "accidents" from causes that are "occurrences" requires drawing a line, and we realise that "reasonable [people] may differ widely as to the place where the line should fall"... We draw this line today only because the language of Article 17 and 18 requires it, and not because of any desire to plunge into the "Serbonian Bog" that accompanies attempts to distinguish between causes that are accidents and injuries that are accidents... Until Article 17 of the Warsaw Convention is changed by the signatories, it cannot be stretched to impose carrier liability for injuries that are not caused by accidents."

United States District Court Judge Joseph E. Irenas stated in another opinion:Tipping the scales at nearly 157 pages, the complaint hardly comports with the principles of brevity......In addition to being overly long, the complaint is inconsistent and confusing, causing this Court to expend much valuable time in an effort to discern its meaning......There is a strong argument that portions of the complaint fail to comply with the strictures of Fed. R. Civ. and might afford this Court a sufficient basis for dismissal.  However, a dismissal without prejudice under Fed. R. Civ. P. 8(a) would only lead to a new filing and needlessly increase the amount of time and money already expended. Thus, the Court will plunge into the complaint's "Serbonian Bog"  and deal with the pending Fed. R. Civ. P. 12(b)(6) motions on the merits.

Justice Breyer used it in a dissenting opinion in Texas v. Cobb'', 532 U.S. 162, 186 (2001).

Judge William H. Pauley III (2004): "This court declines the City's invitation to wander into a Serbonian bog before a state court has had the opportunity to illuminate the path."

Notes

References

Lakes of Egypt
Metaphors
Hellenistic Egypt
Early Modern English literature
Place name etymologies
Names of places in Africa

he:ימת ברדוויל